Forficula pyrenaica is a species of earwigs.

See also 
Earwig

Forficulidae